Sharpe's lark (Mirafra sharpii) is a species of lark in the family Alaudidae found in Somalia.

References

Mirafra
Birds described in 1897